PIONIER is the Polish national research and education network created to provide high-speed Internet access and to conduct network-based research. Most of the government founded higher education organisations and all of metropolitan area networks in Poland are connected to the PIONIER network, and are members of the PIONIER Consortium. The previous versions of the Polish academic computer network were called POL-34 and POL-155.

History

POL-34 was created as a result of an experiment hosted in Poznań in 1997 during a scientific conference in which the representatives of all major Polish MAN's took part. Its target was to create a high-speed WAN. During the experiment Poznań, Łódź and Gdańsk were connected and the 34 Mbit/s ATM network in a 622 Mbit/s SDH environment has been created and since then called POL-34. Since its creation, POL-34 has been a purely Internet Protocol network.

In the beginning, POL-34 used fiber-optic links leased from TEL-ENERGO, a company founded by State Power Companies, Polish Power Networks and Polish Power Distribution Association. At the same time, ever since its creation POL-34 was in the process of creating its own infrastructure. Today the Consortium owns all fiber-optic connections to major nodes.

In 1999 a project to extend the bandwidth of the network was proposed and POL-155 was created. Speed was expanded to 155 Mbit/s Asynchronous Transfer Mode between Gdańsk, Łódź and Poznań and a constant effort to create 155 Mbit/s links between smaller nodes was made.

In 2000 POL-34/155 and various other academic organisations set up a project of creating a 10 Gbit/s network within GEANT project. Network called PIONIER is the result of that project.

Organization

Currently the network connects Białystok, Bielsko-Biała, Bydgoszcz, Częstochowa, Gdańsk, Gliwice, Kielce, Kraków, Lublin, Łódź, Opole, Poznań, Puławy, Radom, Toruń, Warsaw, Wrocław, Koszalin, Szczecin, Olsztyn and Zielona Góra with a fiber-optic 10 Gbit/s patch-cord, and consists of 5738,86 km of optical fiber. PIONIER's Network Operations Center is based in Poznań Supercomputing and Networking Center.

It has connections to various commercial networks, national research and education networks (CESNET, DFN, SANET, URAN), and is well integrated with the GÉANT network.

Both POL-34/155 and PIONIER is operated by a consortium of 22 metropolitan area network operators and other educational institutions. Decisions within the consortium are made by voting.

See also
 Naukowa i Akademicka Sieć Komputerowa

References

External links
 
 Poznań Supercomputing and Networking Center website

Internet in Poland
National research and education networks